Magnolia colombiana is a species of plant in the family Magnoliaceae. It is endemic to Colombia.

References

colombiana
Vulnerable plants
Endemic flora of Colombia
Taxonomy articles created by Polbot
Plants described in 1970